Julio César Nicolari (born 15 March 1905, date of death unknown) was an Uruguayan boxer who competed in the 1924 Summer Olympics. In 1924 he was eliminated in the second round of the lightweight class after losing his fight to Jean Tholey.

References

External links
Profile

1905 births
Lightweight boxers
Olympic boxers of Uruguay
Boxers at the 1924 Summer Olympics
Year of death unknown
Uruguayan male boxers